Psychosis is the fourth studio album by American heavy metal band Cavalera Conspiracy. Released on November 17, 2017, it was released through Napalm Records. It is their last record with guitarist Marc Rizzo. Insane and Spectral War have both been released as singles from the album. The album was produced by Arthur Rizk, who also performed bass and synth on the record.

Track listing
All songs written by Max Cavalera, Igor Cavalera and Marc Rizzo.

Personnel

Cavalera Conspiracy
Max Cavalera – vocals, rhythm guitar
Igor Cavalera – drums, percussion
Marc Rizzo – lead guitar

Production
Arthur Rizk – production, mixing, engineering, bass, noise, synthesizer
Joel Grind – mastering
John Aquilino – engineering
Peter Sallai – artwork
Leonardo da Vinci – illustrations
Branca Studio – layout

Other musicians
Justin Broadrick – vocals on "Hellfire"
Jason Tarpey – vocals on "Crom"
Roki Abdelaziz – vocals on "Crom"
Jose Mangin – spoken word on "Excruciating"
Dominick Fernow – synthesizer on "Spectral War", "Hellfire" and "Excruciating"
Mixhell (Iggor Cavalera and Laima Leyton) – intro on "Psychosis"
Christian Cavalera – hurdy-gurdy on "Judas Pariah"
Aaron Jaws Homoki – jaw-harp on "Excruciating"
Roy Young – didgeridoo on "Excruciating"

Charts

References

2017 albums
Cavalera Conspiracy albums
Napalm Records albums